Venerupis rhomboides is a species of bivalve belonging to the family Veneridae.

The species is found in Western Europe.

References

Veneridae